Capucine (born Germaine Hélène Irène Lefebvre , 6 January 1928 – 17 March 1990) was a French fashion model and actress known for her comedic roles in The Pink Panther (1963) and What's New Pussycat? (1965). She appeared in 36 films and 17 television productions between 1948 and 1990.

Early life
Capucine was born Germaine Hélène Irène Lefebvre on 6 January 1928 in Saint-Raphaël, Var, France. She often confused the date of her birth by saying that she was born in 1931 or 1933, and most sources indicate those years. She attended school in Saumur, France, and attained a Bachelor of Arts degree in foreign languages.

In 1945, at age 17, while riding in a carriage in Paris, Lefebvre was noticed by a commercial photographer. Adopting the French name of a flower, "Capucine" (nasturtium, Tropaeolum), she became a fashion model, working for the fashion houses Givenchy and Christian Dior.

Capucine met Audrey Hepburn while modelling for Givenchy in Paris. They remained close friends for the rest of Capucine's life.

Career

Early films
Capucine made her film debut in Jean Cocteau's The Eagle with Two Heads (1948), in a small, unbilled role. She also appeared in Jacques Becker's Rendezvous in July (1949) and Robert Dhéry's Crazy Show (1949).

She was in My Friend Sainfoin (1950) and Dhery's Bernard and the Lion (1951).

After a break of a few years, Capucine appeared in Mademoiselle from Paris (1955) and Frou-Frou (1955).

Charles K. Feldman
In 1957, film producer Charles K. Feldman spotted Capucine while she was modeling in New York City. Feldman put her under contract at $150 a week. He brought her to Hollywood to learn English and study acting under Gregory Ratoff. She took the stage name "Capucine", saying, "Two names are interesting and I hope one is interesting."

She signed a seven-year contract with Columbia Pictures in 1958. After unsuccessfully auditioning for the role of Feathers in Rio Bravo (1959) she landed her first English-speaking role in the film Song Without End (1960), a biopic of Franz Liszt, where Capucine played Carolyne zu Sayn-Wittgenstein. Producer William Goetz said, "You can teach a girl to act, but nobody can teach her how to look like a princess. You've got to start with a girl who looks like a princess."

"Every time I get in front of the camera, I think of it as an attractive man I am meeting for the first time", she said in 1960. "I find him demanding and aloof, so I must do all I can to interest him." "I got much better as we went on", she said. "As the scenes warmed up, so did I."

She was nominated for a Golden Globe Award.

Capucine followed this with North to Alaska (1960), a comedy which had been set up with her in mind by Feldman at 20th Century Fox. She played a French prostitute who becomes the love interest of John Wayne. Directed by Henry Hathaway, it was successful at the box office.

Capucine returned to Europe to co star in Le triomphe de Michel Strogoff (1961) with Curd Jürgens, a sequel to Michel Strogoff (1956).

Back in Hollywood, she had second billing in Walk on the Wild Side (1962), produced by Feldman, in which she portrayed a redeemed hooker. Co-star Laurence Harvey complained that Feldman cut his part to expand Capucine's role.

She was then William Holden's love interest in The Lion (1962). During filming, Capucine began a romance with Holden, which led to the end of her romantic relationship with Feldman; however, the producer remained loyal professionally.

Feldman announced he would put Capucine in Mary Magdalene and Waltz of the Toreadors but neither happened.

She moved to Switzerland in 1962.

The Pink Panther

Blake Edwards cast Capucine in The Pink Panther, playing Inspector Clouseau's wife, who is having an affair with a jewel thief, played by David Niven. It was a huge hit, and led to a number of sequels. In 1964, Capucine said the directors she had learned most from were Edwards and Henry Hathaway.

Capucine was reunited with Holden in The 7th Dawn (1964) produced by Feldman; it was a box-office disappointment. Another film she did for Feldman, the comedy What's New Pussycat? (1965), which costarred Sellers and Peter O'Toole, was far more successful; it was filmed entirely in France.

Capucine was one of several European stars in Sex Quartet (1966) for Columbia (originally The Queens),) then Feldman put her in The Honey Pot (1967), directed by Joseph L. Mankiewicz. She was announced for Feldman's Casino Royale, but did not appear in the film.

Feldman died in May 1968, and Capucine's career never regained its former momentum. She inherited the rights to the book Zandy from his estate and sold them to the makers of Zandy's Bride.

Post-Feldman
Capucine had a support role in Fräulein Doktor (1968) and the lead in the Spanish thriller The Exquisite Cadaver (1969). She was in the supporting cast of Fellini Satyricon (1969). Fellini said "she had a face to launch a thousand ships... but she was born too late."

In 1968, she told an Italian magazine she wished she didn't always have to be elegant, that she longed to play a "dishevelled woman", but "since the directors know I was a model, it is obvious that they can't see me as anything else."

Dirk Bogarde suggested her for the role of Tadzio's mother in Death in Venice (1971), but Luchino Visconti turned her down, saying, "She has a horrible voice and too many teeth. She looks like a horse, a beautiful horse, I know that, I was a trainer. I know all about horses, but I don't want a horse."

Capucine had a supporting role in the Western Red Sun (1971) and guest starred on Search Control (1972), her first TV series.

She supported Jean-Paul Belmondo in Incorrigible (1975) and Richard Burton in Jackpot, which was ultimately abandoned.

She appeared on television in Cinéma 16, and La pêche miraculeuse (1976), and had roles in The Con Artists (1976), Per amore (1976), Ecco noi per esempio (1977), Nest of Vipers (1978), From Hell to Victory (1979), Atrocious Tales of Love and Death (1979), Neapolitan Mystery (1979), Arabian Adventure (1979), Jaguar Lives! (1979), and Martin Eden (1979).

1980s
Capucine appeared in episodes of Orient Express (1980), Hart to Hart (1982) and Murder, She Wrote (1985), as well as the 1986 miniseries Sins.

She went to Europe to make Les invités (1982), Aphrodite (1982), Trail of the Pink Panther (1982), and Curse of the Pink Panther (1983).

Capucine appears in episodes of Série noire, Voglia di cantare, Murder, She Wrote, Honor Thy Father, Sins, Delirium (1987), My First Forty Years (1987), Gila and Rik (1987), Una verità come un'altra (1989), Quartier nègre (1989), Blaues Blut (1990) and Il giudice istruttore.

Personal life
Capucine met Pierre Trabaud on the set of Rendez-vous (1949) and they married the next year. The marriage lasted only eight months, and she never married again.

She had a relationship with Charles K. Feldman, who produced her films What's New Pussycat?, The 7th Dawn, and The Honey Pot. This affair ended when Capucine met William Holden, but she and Feldman remained friends until his death in 1968. He left her $75,000.

Capucine met actor William Holden in the early 1960s. They starred in the films The Lion (1962) and The 7th Dawn (1964). Holden was married to Brenda Marshall, but the two began a two-year affair, which ended in part due to Holden's increasing alcoholism. After the affair ended, she and Holden remained friends until his death in 1981. In his will, he left her $50,000.

Death
On 17 March 1990, at age 62, Capucine jumped to her death from her eighth-floor apartment in Lausanne, Vaud, Switzerland, where she had lived for 28 years, having reportedly suffered from illness and depression for some time. The police said an investigation left no doubt that she committed suicide. Neighbours said she had led a reclusive life with her three cats, hardly ever leaving her apartment and spending most of her time reading.

Selected filmography

See also

Mononymous persons
List of suicides

References

External links

 
 
 Capucine (Aveleyman.com)

1928 births
1990 deaths
20th-century French actresses
French expatriates in Switzerland
French female models
French film actresses
French television actresses
Suicides by jumping in Switzerland
People from Saint-Raphaël, Var
1990 suicides
Female suicides